The former French Catholic Diocese of Noyon lay in the north-east of France, around Noyon. It was formed when Saint Medardus moved the seat of the bishopric at Vermandois to Noyon, in the sixth century. For four centuries it was united with the bishopric of Tournai as the Diocese of Noyon–Tournai. Then in the twelfth century it was again independent, and the bishop of Noyon became a pairie-comté of France.

The diocese of Noyon was brought to an end by the French Revolution. Its territory passed to the diocese of Beauvais.

Bishops
 Faustin
 Gondulph
 Evroul
 Bertimond
 c. 531–545 : Medardus
Unified with Tournai
 642–660: Saint Eligius
 660–686: Saint Mommolin
 841–859 : Immo
 994: Radbod
 1146–1148 : Simon of Vermandois
 1148–1167 : Baldwin II of Boulogne
 1167–1174 or 1175  : Baldwin III de Beuseberg
 1175–1188 : Renaud
 1188–1221 : Stephan of Nemours
 1222–1228 : Gérard de Bazoches
 1228–1240 : Nicolas de Roye
 1240–1249 : Pierre I Charlot
 1250–1272 : Vermond de La Boissière
 1272–1297 : Guy II des Prés (Prez)
 1297–1301 : Simon II of Clermont-Nesle, son of Simon II of Clermont, Seigneur of Nesle
 1301–1303 : Peire de Ferrières (also bishop of Arles)
 1304–1315 : André Le Moine de Crécy
 1315–1317 : Florent de La Boissière
 1317–1331 : Foucaud de Rochechouart (also bishop of Bourges)
 1331–1338 : Guillaume Bertrand (also bishop of Bayeux)
 1338–1339 : Étienne Aubert
 1339–1342 : Pierre D'André (also bishop of Clermont)
 1342–1347 : Bernard Brion (or Le Brun) (also bishop of Auxerre)
 1347–1349 :Guy de Comborn
 1349–1350 : Firmin Coquerel
 1350–1351 : Philippe D'Arbois (also bishop of Tournai)
 1351–1352 : Jean de Meulan (also bishop of Paris)
 1352–1388 : Gilles de Lorris
 1388–1409 : Philippe de Moulins (also bishop of Évreux)
 1409–1415 : Pierre Fresnel (also bishop of Meaux and Lisieux)
 1415–1424 : Raoul de Coucy
 1425–1473 : Jean de Mailly
 1473–1501 : Guillaume Marafin
 1501–1525 : Charles de Hangest
 1525–1577 : Jean de Hangest
 1577–1588 : Claude D'Angennes de Rambouillet
 1588–1590 or 1593 : Gabriel Le Genevois de Bleigny (Blaigny)
 1590–1594 : Jean Meusnier (Munier)
 1594–1596 : François-Annibal D'Estrées
 1596–1625 : Charles de Balsac (Balzac)
 1625 : Gilles de Lourmé 
 1626–1660 : Henri de Baradat
 1661–1701 : François de Clermont-Tonnerre
 1701–1707 : Claude-Maur D'Aubigné (also archbishop of Rouen)
 1707–1731 : Charles-François de Châteauneuf de Rochebonne
 1731–1733 : Claude de Rouvroy de Saint-Simon
 1734–1766 : Jean-François de La Cropte de Bourzac
 1766–1777 : Charles de Broglie
 1778–1808 : Louis-André de Grimaldi

See also
Catholic Church in France
List of Catholic dioceses in France

References

Bibliography

Reference works
  (Use with caution; obsolete)
  (in Latin) 
 (in Latin)

Studies

External links
Catholic Hierarchy page  from 1660 onwards
 Les évêques de Noyon de l'an 531 à la Révolution française

Noyon
Noyon
Viromandui